The 2002 Boston Red Sox season was the 102nd season in the franchise's Major League Baseball history. The Red Sox finished second in the American League East with a record of 93 wins and 69 losses,  games behind the New York Yankees. The Red Sox did not qualify for the postseason, as the AL wild card went to the Anaheim Angels, who had finished second in the American League West with a record of 99–63.

Offseason 
 October 9, 2001: Craig Grebeck was released by the Boston Red Sox.
 December 21, 2001: Johnny Damon signed a four-year, $31 million contract to join the Boston Red Sox
 February 13, 2002: Rickey Henderson signed with the Boston Red Sox.

Regular season 
 In May 2002, former Red Sox clubhouse staffer Donald James Fitzpatrick pleaded guilty to charges that he sexually abused several young boys at the team's spring training facility in Winter Haven, Florida.
 Martínez pitched the first immaculate inning in franchise history, striking out all three Seattle Mariners batters on a total of nine pitches in the first inning on May 18.
 Seven Red Sox players were voted on to the American League roster for the 2002 MLB All-Star Game played in Milwaukee at Miller Park. Pitcher Derek Lowe, left fielder Manny Ramirez and third baseman Shea Hillenbrand started the game, while pitchers Pedro Martínez and Ugueth Urbina joined shortstop Nomar Garciaparra and outfielder Johnny Damon as reserves.
 Pedro Martínez became the first major league player to win 20 games in one season but pitch less than 200 innings.

Season standings

American League Wild Card

Record vs. opponents

Transactions 
 April 27, 2002: Wayne Gomes was signed as a free agent with the Boston Red Sox.
 June 26, 2002: Alan Embree was traded by the San Diego Padres with Andy Shibilo (minors) to the Boston Red Sox for Dan Giese and Brad Baker (minors).
 July 30, 2002: Cliff Floyd was traded by the Montreal Expos to the Boston Red Sox for Sun-Woo Kim and Seung Song (minors).

Opening Day lineup

Roster

Player stats

Batting 
Note: Pos = Position; G = Games played; AB = At bats; H = Hits; Avg. = Batting average; HR = Home runs; RBI = Runs batted in; SB = Stolen bases

Starters by position

Other batters 
Note: G = Games played; AB = At bats; H = Hits; Avg. = Batting average; HR = Home runs; RBI = Runs batted in; SB = Stolen bases

Pitching

Starting pitchers 
Note: G = Games pitched; GS = Games started; IP = Innings pitched; W = Wins; L = Losses; SV = Saves; ERA = Earned run average; SO = Strikeouts

Other pitchers 
Note: G = Games pitched; GS = Games started; IP = Innings pitched; W = Wins; L = Losses; SV = Saves; ERA = Earned run average; SO = Strikeouts

Relief pitchers 
Note: G = Games pitched; GS = Games started; IP = Innings pitched; W = Wins; L = Losses; SV = Saves; ERA = Earned run average; SO = Strikeouts

Game log 

|- style="text-align:center; background-color:#fbb;"
| 1 || April 1 || Blue Jays  || 11–12 || Escobar (1–0) || Urbina (0–1) || — || Fenway Park || 33,520 || 0–1 || L1
|- style="text-align:center; background-color:#bbb"
| — || April 3 || Blue Jays  || colspan=8|Postponed (rain). Makeup date July 2.
|- style="text-align:center; background-color:#bfb;"
| 2 || April 5 || @ Orioles  || 3–0 || Lowe (1–0) || Towers (0–1) || Urbina (1) || Camden Yards || 31,261  || 1–1 || W1
|- style="text-align:center; background-color:#bfb;"
| 3 || April 6 || @ Orioles  || 4–2 || Fossum (1–0)  || Erickson (1–1) || Urbina (2) || Camden Yards || 34,978 || 2–1 || W2
|- style="text-align:center; background-color:#bfb;"
| 4 || April 7 || @ Orioles  || 4–1 || Martínez (1–0)  || Maduro (0–1)  || Urbina (3)  || Camden Yards || 33,790 || 3–1 || W3
|- style="text-align:center; background-color:#bfb;"
| 5 || April 9 || Royals || 8–4 || Wakefield (1–0) || Reichert (0–2) || — || Fenway Park || 31,115 || 4–1 || W4
|- style="text-align:center; background-color:#fbb;"
| 6 || April 10 || Royals  || 2–6 || Byrd (2–0) || Lowe (1–1) || Bailey (1) || Fenway Park || 33,376 || 4–2 || L1
|- style="text-align:center; background-color:#fbb;"
| 7 || April 11 || Royals  || 5–8 || Grimsley (1–0) || Urbina (0–2) || — || Fenway Park || 32,953 || 4–3 || L2
|- style="text-align:center; background-color:#bfb;"
| 8 || April 12 || Yankees  || 3–2  || Oliver (1–0) || Hernández (1–1) || Urbina (4) || Fenway Park || 32,812 || 5–3 || W1
|- style="text-align:center; background-color:#bfb"
| 9 || April 13 || Yankees || 7–6 || Arrojo (1–0) || Rivera (0–1) || Urbina (5) || Fenway Park || 33,756 || 6–3 || W2
|- style="text-align:center; background-color:#fbb"
| 10 || April 14 || Yankees || 2–6 || Mussina (3–0) || Wakefield (1–1) || Rivera (5) || Fenway Park || 33,742 || 6–4 || L1
|- style="text-align:center; background-color:#bfb"
| 11 || April 15 || Yankees || 4–3 || Lowe (2–1) || Pettitte (1–1) || Urbina (6) || Fenway Park || 33,864 || 7–4 || W1
|- style="text-align:center; background-color:#bfb"
| 12 || April 16 || @ Blue Jays || 14–3 || Castillo (1–0) || Lyon (0–2) || Arrojo (1) || SkyDome || 16,069 || 8–4 || W2
|- style="text-align:center; background-color:#bfb"
| 13 || April 17 || @ Blue Jays || 10–4 || Oliver (2–0) || Eyre (1–2) || — || SkyDome || 16,572 || 9–4 || W3
|- style="text-align:center; background-color:#bfb"
| 14 || April 19 || @ Royals || 4–0 || Martínez (2–0) || George (0–1) || — || Kauffman Stadium || 24,456 || 10–4 || W4
|- style="text-align:center; background-color:#bbb"
| — || April 20 || @ Royals  || colspan=8|Postponed (rain). Makeup date April 21.
|- style="text-align:center; background-color:#bfb"
| 15 || April 21 (1)|| @ Royals || 12–2 || Burkett (1–0) || Reichert (0–3) || Wakefield (1) || Kauffman Stadium || — || 11–4 || W5
|- style="text-align:center; background-color:#bfb;"
| 16 || April 21 (2)|| @ Royals || 8–7 || Lowe (3–1) || Rekar (0–1) || Urbina (7) || Kauffman Stadium || 17,289 || 12–4 || W6
|- style="text-align:center; background-color:#fbb;"
| 17 || April 23 || @ Orioles || 5–7 || Erickson (2–2) || Castillo (1–1) || Julio (2) || Camden Yards || 26,301 || 12–5 || L1
|- style="text-align:center; background-color:#fbb;"
| 18 || April 24 || @ Orioles || 3–5 || López (2–0) || Oliver (2–1) || Julio (3) || Camden Yards || 29,004 || 12–6 || L2
|- style="text-align:center; background-color:#bfb;"
| 19 || April 25 || @ Orioles || 7–0 || Martínez (3–0) || Maduro (1–2) || — || Camden Yards || 31,353 || 13–6 || W1
|- style="text-align:center; background-color:#bfb;"
| 20 || April 26 || Devil Rays  || 4–2 || Burkett (2–0) || Wilson (1–2) || Urbina (8) || Fenway Park || 32,292 || 14–6 || W2
|- style="text-align:center; background-color:#bfb;"
| 21 || April 27 || Devil Rays || 10–0 || Lowe (4–1) || James (0–2) || — || Fenway Park || 32,387 || 15–6 || W3
|- style="text-align:center; background-color:#bbb"
| — || April 28 || Devil Rays  || colspan=8|Postponed (rain). Makeup date July 23.
|- style="text-align:center; background-color:#fbb;"
| 22 || April 29 || Orioles || 3–5 || López (3–0) || Castillo (1–2) || Julio (4) || Fenway Park || 31,177 || 15–7 || L1
|- style="text-align:center; background-color:#bfb;"
| 23 || April 30 || Orioles  || 4–0 || Oliver (3–1) || Maduro (1–3) || — || Fenway Park || 31,571 || 16–7 || W1
|-

|- style="text-align:center; background-color:#bfb"
| 24 || May 1 || Orioles || 15–3 || Martínez (4–0) || Douglass (0–1) || — || Fenway Park || 33,274 || 17–7 || W2
|- style="text-align:center; background-color:#bfb"
| 25 || May 3 || @ Devil Rays || 3–2 || Fossum (2–0) || Colomé (1–3) || Urbina (9) || Tropicana Field || 12,583 || 18–7 || W3 
|- style="text-align:center; background-color:#bfb;"
| 26 || May 4 || @ Devil Rays || 7–5 || Kim (1–0) || Zambrano (1–2) || Urbina (10) || Tropicana Field || 17,972 || 19–7 || W4 
|- style="text-align:center; background-color:#bfb;"
| 27 || May 5 || @ Devil Rays || 2–0 || Castillo (2–2) || Rupe (3–3) || Urbina (11) || Tropicana Field || 15,920 || 20–7 || W5 
|- style="text-align:center; background-color:#bfb;"
| 28 || May 6 || @ Devil Rays || 5–3 || Oliver (4–1) || Sturtze (0–4) || Wakefield (2) || Tropicana Field || 11,564 || 21–7 || W6 
|- style="text-align:center; background-color:#bfb;"
| 29 || May 7 || @ Athletics || 9–7 || Arrojo (2–0) || Mecir (1–1) || Urbina (12) || Network Associates Coliseum || 19,715 || 22–7 || W7 
|- style="text-align:center; background-color:#bfb;"
| 30 || May 8 || @ Athletics || 12–6 || Burkett (3–0) || Hiljus (3–2) || — || Network Associates Coliseum || 40,155 || 23–7 || W8 
|- style="text-align:center; background-color:#bfb;"
| 31 || May 9 || @ Athletics || 5–1 || Lowe (5–1) || Hudson (3–4) || — || Network Associates Coliseum || 18,477 || 24–7 || W9 
|- style="text-align:center; background-color:#fbb;"
| 32 || May 10 || @ Mariners || 2–7 || Piñeiro (3–0) || Castillo (2–3) || Soriano (1) || Safeco Field || 45,833 || 24–8 || L1 
|- style="text-align:center; background-color:#fbb;"
| 33 || May 11 || @ Mariners || 1–3 || Halama (2–0) || Oliver (4–2) || Sasaki (8) || Safeco Field || 45,887 || 24–9 || L2 
|- style="text-align:center; background-color:#bfb;"
| 34 || May 12 || @ Mariners || 10–4 ||Martínez (5–0) || Baldwin (3–3) || — || Safeco Field || 45,862 || 25–9 || W1 
|- style="text-align:center; background-color:#bfb;"
| 35 || May 14 || Athletics || 6–2 || Burkett (4–0) || Hudson (3–5) || — || Fenway Park || 31,404 || 26–9 || W2 
|- style="text-align:center; background-color:#bfb"
| 36 || May 15 || Athletics || 8–2 || Lowe (6–1) || Hiljus (3–3) || — || Fenway Park || 32,346 || 27–9 || W3 
|- style="text-align:center; background-color:#fbb"
| 37 || May 16 || Athletics || 0–5 || Zito (4–2) || Castillo (2–4) || — || Fenway Park || 33,057 || 27–10 || L1 
|- style="text-align:center; background-color:#fbb"
| 38 || May 17 || Mariners || 3–6 || Franklin (4–1) || Arrojo (2–1) || Sasaki (10) || Fenway Park || 33,205 || 27–11 || L2 
|- style="text-align:center; background-color:#bfb"
| 39 || May 18 || Mariners || 4–1 || Martínez (6–0) || Baldwin (3–4) || Urbina (13) || Fenway Park || 32,385 || 28–11 || W1 
|- style="text-align:center; background-color:#bfb"
| 40 || May 19 || Mariners || 3–2 || Burkett (5–0) || García (4–4) || Urbina (14) || Fenway Park || 32,783 || 29–11 || W2
|- style="text-align:center; background-color:#bfb"
| 41 || May 20 || White Sox || 9–0 || Lowe (7–1) || Ritchie (3–5) || — || Fenway Park || 32,461 || 30–11 || W3
|- style="text-align:center; background-color:#fbb"
| 42 || May 21 || White Sox || 3–8 || Wright (5–4) || Oliver (4–3) || — || Fenway Park || 31,772 || 30–12 || L1 
|- style="text-align:center; background-color:#fbb;"
| 43 || May 22 || White Sox || 0–2 || Garland (5–3) || Castillo (2–5) || Foulke (7) || Fenway Park || 33,157 || 30–13 || L2 
|- style="text-align:center; background-color:#bfb;"
| 44 || May 23 || Yankees || 3–1 || Martínez (7–0) || Lilly (1–4) || Urbina (15) || Fenway Park || 33,884 || 31–13 || W1 
|- style="text-align:center; background-color:#bfb;"
| 45 || May 24 || Yankees || 9–8 (11)|| Arrojo (3–1) || Karsay (1–2) || — || Fenway Park || 34,175 || 32–13 || W2 
|- style="text-align:center; background-color:#fbb"
| 46 || May 25 || Yankees || 2–3 || Mendoza (2–2) || Lowe (7–2) || Rivera (15) || Fenway Park || 33,743 || 32–14 || L1 
|- style="text-align:center; background-color:#fbb"
| 47 || May 26 || Yankees || 5–14 || Mussina (7–2) || Oliver (4–4) || — || Fenway Park || 34,096 || 32–15 || L2 
|- style="text-align:center; background-color:#bfb"
| 48 || May 27 || @ Blue Jays || 8–6 || Castillo (3–5) || Halladay (5–2) || Urbina (16) || SkyDome || 14,108 || 33–15 || W1 
|- style="text-align:center; background-color:#bfb"
| 49 || May 28 || @ Blue Jays || 6–4 || Wakefield (2–1) || Escobar (1–2) || Urbina (17) || SkyDome || 13,075 || 34–15 || W2 
|- style="text-align:center; background-color:#bfb"
| 50 || May 29 || @ Blue Jays || 7–4 || Burkett (6–0) || Cassidy (0–1) || Fossum (1) || SkyDome || 17,875 || 35–15 || W3 
|- style="text-align:center; background-color:#bfb"
| 51 || May 31 || @ Yankees  || 5–2 ||  Lowe (8–2) ||  Wells (6–2) || — || Yankee Stadium || 52,941 || 36–15 || W4 
|-

|- style="text-align:center; background-color:#fbb;"
| 52 || June 1 || @ Yankees || 2–10 || Mussina (8–2) || Oliver (4–5) || — || Yankee Stadium || 55,699 || 36–16 || L1 
|- style="text-align:center; background-color:#bfb;"
| 53 || June 2 || @ Yankees || 7–1 || Castillo (4–5) || Lilly (2–5) || — || Yankee Stadium || 55,602 || 37–16 || W1
|- style="text-align:center; background-color:#fbb;"
| 54 || June 3 || @ Tigers || 6–7 (10)|| Acevedo (1–1) || Wakefield (2–2) || — || Comerica Park || 12,918 || 37–17 || L1
|- style="text-align:center; background-color:#bfb"
| 55 || June 4 || @ Tigers || 10–5 || Burkett (7–0) || Lima (1–4) || — || Comerica Park || 14,254 || 38–17 || W1
|- style="text-align:center; background-color:#bfb"
| 56 || June 5 || @ Tigers || 11–0 || Lowe (9–2) || Bernero (1–2) || Haney (1) || Comerica Park || 15,537 || 39–17 || W2 
|- style="text-align:center; background-color:#bfb"
| 57 || June 6 || @ Tigers || 4–3 || Arrojo (4–1) || Redman (2–6) || Urbina (18) || Comerica Park || 21,992 || 40–17 || W3 
|- style="text-align:center; background-color:#fbb"
| 58 || June 7 || Diamondbacks || 5–7 || Batista (3–3) || Castillo (4–6) || Kim (15) || Fenway Park || 32,853 || 40–18 || L1
|- style="text-align:center; background-color:#fbb"
| 59 || June 8 || Diamondbacks || 2–3 || Schilling (12–1) || Martínez (7–1) || Kim (16) || Fenway Park || 33,275 || 40–19 || L2 
|- style="text-align:center; background-color:#fbb"
| 60 || June 9 || Diamondbacks || 3–7 || Helling (6–5) || Burkett (7–1) || — || Fenway Park || 32,209 || 40–20 || L3
|- style="text-align:center; background-color:#bfb;"
| 61 || June 10 || Rockies || 7–3 || Lowe (10–2) || Neagle (4–3) || Wakefield (3) || Fenway Park || 33,508 || 41–20 || W1
|- style="text-align:center; background-color:#fbb;"
| 62 || June 11 || Rockies || 1–3 || Jennings (8–2) || Fossum (2–1) || Jiménez (17) || Fenway Park || 32,340 || 41–21 || L1
|- style="text-align:center; background-color:#bfb;"
| 63 || June 12 || Rockies || 7–5 || Castillo (5–6) || Hampton (3–8) || Urbina (19) || Fenway Park || 31,583 || 42–21 || W1
|- style="text-align:center; background-color:#fbb;"
| 64 || June 14 || @ Braves || 1–2 || Hammond (5–2) || Martínez (7–2) || Smoltz (20) || Turner Field || 48,922 || 42–22 || L1 
|- style="text-align:center; background-color:#fbb;"
| 65 || June 15 || @ Braves || 2–4 || Maddux (7–2) || Burkett (7–2) || Smoltz (21) || Turner Field || 50,764 || 42–23 || L2
|- style="text-align:center; background-color:#bfb;"
| 66 || June 16 || @ Braves || 6–1 || Lowe (11–2) || Glavine (11–3) || — || Turner Field || 45,666 || 43–23 || W1
|- style="text-align:center; background-color:#bfb;"
| 67 || June 18 || @ Padres || 4–2 || Banks (1–0) || Lawrence (7–4) || Urbina (20) || Qualcomm Stadium || 30,212 || 44–23 || W2
|- style="text-align:center; background-color:#fbb;"
| 68 || June 19 || @ Padres || 2–3 || Tomko (4–5) || Castillo (5–7) || Hoffman (19) || Qualcomm Stadium || 32,974 || 44–24 || L1 
|- style="text-align:center; background-color:#bfb;"
| 69 || June 20 || @ Padres || 5–0 || Martínez (8–2) || Pickford (0–2) || — || Qualcomm Stadium || 35,346 || 45–24 || W1
|- style="text-align:center; background-color:#fbb;"
| 70 || June 21 || @ Dodgers || 2–3 || Nomo (7–5) || Burkett (7–3) || Gagné (26) || Dodger Stadium || 46,719 || 45–25 || L1
|- style="text-align:center; background-color:#fbb"
| 71 || June 22 || @ Dodgers || 4–5 || Daal (5–3) || Lowe (11–3) || Gagné (27) || Dodger Stadium || 43,833 || 45–26 || L2
|- style="text-align:center; background-color:#fbb"
| 72 || June 23 || @ Dodgers || 6–9 || Ashby (7–6) || Arrojo (4–2) || — || Dodger Stadium || 45,960 || 45–27 || L3 
|- style="text-align:center; background-color:#fbb"
| 73 || June 25 || Indians || 2–4 || Báez (6–5) || Castillo (5–8) || Wickman (18) || Fenway Park || 34,064 || 45–28 || L4
|- style="text-align:center; background-color:#bfb"
| 74 || June 26 || Indians || 7–4 || Martínez (9–2) || Drese (7–6) || Urbina (21) || Fenway Park || 32,255 || 46–28 || W1
|- style="text-align:center; background-color:#bbb"
| — || June 27 || Indians  || colspan=8|Postponed (rain). Makeup date September 26.
|- style="text-align:center; background-color:#fbb"
| 75 || June 28 || Braves || 2–4 || Remlinger (4–0) || Wakefield (2–3) || Smoltz (26) || Fenway Park || 33,137 || 46–29 || L1
|- style="text-align:center; background-color:#fbb"
| 76 || June 29 || Braves || 1–2 || Millwood (5–5) || Lowe (11–4) || Smoltz (27) || Fenway Park || 32,651 || 46–30 || L2
|- style="text-align:center; background-color:#fbb;"
| 77 || June 30 ||Braves || 3–7 (10)|| Remlinger (5–0) || Urbina (0–3) || — || Fenway Park || 32,348 || 46–31 || L3
|-

|- style="text-align:center; background-color:#bfb;"
| 78 || July 1 || Blue Jays || 4–0 || Martínez (10–2) || Parris (0–2) || — || Fenway Park || 33,005 || 47–31 || W1
|- style="text-align:center; background-color:#bfb"
| 79 || July 2 (1)|| Blue Jays || 2–1 || Banks (2–0) || Eyre (2–4) || Embree (1) || Fenway Park || 32,993 || 48–31 || W2
|- style="text-align:center; background-color:#bfb"
| 80 || July 2 (2)|| Blue Jays  || 6–4 || Kim (2–0) || Smith (0–2) || Embree (2) || Fenway Park || 32,902 || 49–31 || W3
|- style="text-align:center; background-color:#bfb"
| 81 || July 3 || Blue Jays  || 5–2 || Gomes (1–0) || Politte (3–2) || Urbina (22) || Fenway Park || 31,777 || 50–31 || W4
|- style="text-align:center; background-color:#bfb;"
| 82 || July 4 || Blue Jays || 9–5 || Lowe (12–4) || Heredia (0–2) || — || Fenway Park || 32,086 || 51–31 || W5
|- style="text-align:center; background-color:#fbb;"
| 83 || July 5 || Tigers  || 5–9 || Redman (4–8) || Castillo (5–9) || — || Fenway Park || 33,571 || 51–32 || L1
|- style="text-align:center; background-color:#bfb;"
| 84 || July 6 || Tigers || 8–0 || Martínez (11–2) || Maroth (1–3) || — || Fenway Park || 32,485 || 52–32 || W1
|- style="text-align:center; background-color:#fbb"
| 85 || July 7 || Tigers || 8–9 || Farnsworth (2–1) || Garcés (0–1) || Acedevo (14) || Fenway Park || 33,297 || 52–33 || L1
|- style="text-align:center; background-color:#bfb"
| 86 || July 11 || @ Blue Jays || 10–3 || Burkett (8–3) || Walker (3–1) || — || SkyDome || 19,494 || 53–33 || W1 
|- style="text-align:center; background-color:#fbb"
| 87 || July 12 || @ Blue Jays || 0–5 || Halladay (10–4) || Lowe (12–5) || — || SkyDome || 20,185 || 53–34 || L1
|- style="text-align:center; background-color:#fbb"
| 88 || July 13 || @ Blue Jays  || 1–4 || Carpenter (2–1) || Castillo (5–10) || — || SkyDome || 28,112 || 53–35 || L2
|- style="text-align:center; background-color:#fbb"
| 89 || July 14 || @ Blue Jays || 5–6 || Escobar (5–4) || Urbina (0–4) || — || SkyDome || 24,140 || 53–36 || L3
|- style="text-align:center; background-color:#fbb"
| 90 || July 15 || @ Tigers || 3–4 (11) || Henríquez (1–0) || Gomes (1–1) || — || Comerica Park || 21,687 || 53–37 || L4
|- style="text-align:center; background-color:#bfb"
| 91 || July 16 || @ Tigers || 9–4 || Burkett (9–3) || Farnsworth (2–2) || — || Comerica Park || 21,654 || 54–37 || W1
|- style="text-align:center; background-color:#bfb;"
| 92 || July 17 || @ Devil Rays || 6–1 || Lowe (13–5) || Wilson (2–7) || — || Tropicana Field || 15,672 || 55–37 || W2
|- style="text-align:center; background-color:#bfb;"
| 93 || July 18 || @ Devil Rays || 4–3 || Wakefield (3–3) || Yan (5–5) || Urbina (23) || Tropicana Field || 22,012 || 56–37 || W3
|- style="text-align:center; background-color:#bfb;"
| 94 || July 19 || @ Yankees || 4–2 || Martínez (12–2) || Mussina (12–4) || Urbina (24) || Yankee Stadium || 55,510 || 57–37 || W4
|- style="text-align:center; background-color:#fbb;"
| 95 || July 20 || @ Yankees || 8–9 (11) || Karsay (5–4) || Gomes (1–2) || — || Yankee Stadium || 55,526 || 57–38 || L1
|- style="text-align:center; background-color:#fbb;"
| 96 || July 21 || @ Yankees || 8–9 || Stanton (4–1) || Urbina (0–5) || — || Yankee Stadium || 55,581 || 57–39 || L2
|- style="text-align:center; background-color:#bfb"
| 97 || July 23 (1)|| Devil Rays || 22–4 || Wakefield (4–3) || Sturtze (1–10) || Banks (1) || Fenway Park || 33,190 || 58–39 || W1
|- style="text-align:center; background-color:#fbb"
| 98 || July 23 (2)|| Devil Rays || 4–5 || Zambrano (4–4) || Urbina (0–6) || Yan (13) || Fenway Park || 32,729 || 58–40 || L1
|- style="text-align:center; background-color:#fbb"
| 99 || July 24 || Devil Rays || 5–9 || Colomé (2–5) || Castillo (5–11) || Zambrano (1) || Fenway Park || 32,969 || 58–41 || L2
|- style="text-align:center; background-color:#bfb"
| 100 || July 25 || Devil Rays || 6–0 || Martínez (13–2) || de los Santos (0–2) || — || Fenway Park || 33,439 || 59–41 || W1
|- style="text-align:center; background-color:#fbb"
| 101 || July 26 || Orioles || 2–9 || López (11–3) || Arrojo (4–3) || — || Fenway Park || 33,840 || 59–42 || L1
|- style="text-align:center; background-color:#bfb"
| 102 || July 27 || Orioles || 4–0 || Burkett (10–3) || Ponson (4–5) || — || Fenway Park || 33,474 || 60–42 || W1
|- style="text-align:center; background-color:#bfb"
| 103 || July 28 || Orioles || 12–3 || Lowe (14–5) || Erickson (4–10) || — || Fenway Park || 33,371 || 61–42 || W2
|- style="text-align:center; background-color:#fbb"
| 104 || July 29 || @ Angels || 4–5 || Schoenweis (8–7) || Embree (3–5) || Percival (24) || Edison Field || 27,929 || 61–43 || L1
|- style="text-align:center; background-color:#bfb"
| 105 || July 30 || @ Angels || 6–0 || Martínez (14–2) || Ortiz (9–8) || — || Edison Field || 32,812 || 62–43 || W1
|- style="text-align:center; background-color:#bfb"
| 106 || July 31 || @ Angels || 2–1 || Wakefield (5–3) || Lackey (2–2) || Urbina (25) || Edison Field || 28,227 || 63–43 || W2
|-

|- style="text-align:center; background-color:#fbb"
| 107 || August 1 || @ Rangers || 7–19 || Park (4–5) || Burkett (10–4) || — || The Ballpark at Arlington || 24,834 || 63–44 || L1
|- style="text-align:center; background-color:#bfb"
| 108 || August 2 || @ Rangers || 13–0 || Lowe (15–5) || Valdéz (5–8) || — || The Ballpark at Arlington || 32,366 || 64–44 || W1
|- style="text-align:center; background-color:#fbb"
| 109 || August 3 || @ Rangers || 6–8 || Kolb (2–0) || Howry (2–3) || — || The Ballpark at Arlington || 44,291 || 64–45 || L1
|- style="text-align:center; background-color:#bfb"
| 110 || August 4 || @ Rangers || 11–3 || Martínez (15–2) || Myette (0–4) || — || The Ballpark at Arlington || 29,359 || 65–45 || W1
|- style="text-align:center; background-color:#fbb;"
| 111 || August 6 || Athletics || 1–9 || Mulder (13–6) || Wakefield (5–4) || — || Fenway Park || 34,059 || 65–46 || L1
|- style="text-align:center; background-color:#fbb;"
| 112 || August 7 || Athletics || 2–3 || Harang (4–2) || Burkett (10–5) || Koch (28) || Fenway Park || 33,325 || 65–47 || L2
|- style="text-align:center; background-color:#bfb;"
| 113 || August 8 || Athletics || 4–2 || Lowe (16–5) || Zito (15–5) || Urbina (26) || Fenway Park || 33,855 || 66–47 || W1
|- style="text-align:center; background-color:#fbb;"
| 114 || August 9 || Twins || 4–5 || Romero (8–1) || Castillo (5–12) || Guardado (34) || Fenway Park || 33,973 || 66–48 || L1
|- style="text-align:center; background-color:#bfb;"
| 115 || August 10 || Twins || 2–0 || Martínez (16–2) || Mays (1–4) || Urbina (27) || Fenway Park || 32,018 || 67–48 || W1
|- style="text-align:center; background-color:#bfb;"
| 116 || August 11 || Twins || 3–1 || Wakefield (6–4) || Santana (6–4) || Urbina (28) || Fenway Park || 33,470 || 68–48 || W2
|- style="text-align:center; background-color:#fbb;"
| 117 || August 13 || @ Mariners || 3–10 || Piñeiro (12–4) || Burkett (10–6) || — || Safeco Field || 45,703 || 68–49 || L1
|- style="text-align:center; background-color:#bfb;"
| 118 || August 14 || @ Mariners || 12–5 || Lowe (17–5) || Moyer (12–5) || — || Safeco Field || 45,233 || 69–49 || W1
|- style="text-align:center; background-color:#fbb;"
| 119 || August 15 || @ Mariners || 3–4 || García (13–8) || Fossum (2–2) || Sasaki (30) || Safeco Field || 45,645 || 69–50 || L1
|- style="text-align:center; background-color:#fbb"
| 120 || August 16 || @ Twins || 0–5 || Mays (2–4) || Martínez (16–3) || — || Metrodome || 35,824 || 69–51 || L2
|- style="text-align:center; background-color:#bfb"
| 121 || August 17 || @ Twins || 5–2 || Wakefield (7–4) || Santana (6–5) || — || Metrodome || 43,345 || 70–51 || W1
|- style="text-align:center; background-color:#fbb"
| 122 || August 18 || @ Twins || 2–6 || Reed (11–6) || Burkett (10–7) || — || Metrodome || 37,196 || 70–52 || L1
|- style="text-align:center; background-color:#fbb"
| 123 || August 20 || Rangers || 2–3 (10)|| Rodriguez (2–1) || Banks (2–1) || Cordero (5) || Fenway Park || 33,742 || 70–53 || L2
|- style="text-align:center; background-color:#bfb"
| 124 || August 21 || Rangers || 5–3 || Howry (3–3) || Kolb (3–2) || Urbina (29) || Fenway Park || 32,746 || 71–53 || W1
|- style="text-align:center; background-color:#bfb"
| 125 || August 22 || Rangers || 12–3 || Hermanson (1–0) || Reyes (1–2) || Castillo (1) || Fenway Park || 33,104 || 72–53 || W2
|- style="text-align:center; background-color:#bfb"
| 126 || August 23 || Angels || 4–1 || Martínez (17–3) || Washburn (15–5) || Urbina (30) || Fenway Park || 33,221 || 73–53 || W3
|- style="text-align:center; background-color:#fbb;"
| 127 || August 24 || Angels || 0–2 || Appier (12–9) || Wakfield (7–5) || Percival (31) || Fenway Park || 32,510 || 73–54 || L1
|- style="text-align:center; background-color:#fbb;"
| 128 || August 25 || Angels || 3–8 || Schoeneweis (9–7) || Lowe (17–6) || — || Fenway Park || 32,059 || 73–55 || L2
|- style="text-align:center; background-color:#bfb;"6
| 129 || August 26 || Angels || 10–9 (10)|| Urbina (1–6) || Shields (3–3) || — || Fenway Park || 32,869 || 74–55 || W1
|- style="text-align:center; background-color:#fbb"
| 130 || August 27 || Yankees || 0–6 || Wells (15–6) || Fossum (2–3) || — || Fenway Park || 33,810 || 74–56 || L1
|- style="text-align:center; background-color:#fbb"
| 131 || August 28 || Yankees || 0–7 || Mussina (16–7) || Martínez (17–4) || — || Fenway Park || 33,793 || 74–57 || L2
|- style="text-align:center; background-color:#bfb;"
| 132 || August 30 || @ Indians || 15–5 || Lowe (18–6) || Wright (0–3) || — || Jacobs Field || 31,986 || 75–57 || W1
|- style="text-align:center; background-color:#fbb;"
| 133 || August 31 || @ Indians || 7–8 || Báez (10–10) || Howry (3–4) || — || Jacobs Field || 37,908 || 75–58 || L1
|-

|- style="text-align:center; background-color:#bfb;"
| 134 || September 1 || @ Indians || 7–1 || Wakefield (8–5) || Nagy (1–4) || — || Jacobs Field || 34,799 || 76–58 || W1
|- style="text-align:center; background-color:#bfb;"
| 135 || September 2 || @ Yankees || 8–4 || Fossum (3–3) || Mussina (16–8) || — || Yankee Stadium || 55,169 || 77–58 || W2
|- style="text-align:center; background-color:#fbb;"
| 136 || September 3 || @ Yankees || 2–4 || Clemens (12–5) || Castillo (5–13) || Stanton (3) || Yankee Stadium || 47,318 || 77–59 || L1
|- style="text-align:center; background-color:#fbb;"
| 137 || September 4 || @ Yankees || 1–3 || Pettitte (9–5) || Lowe (18–7) || Karsay (9) || Yankee Stadium || 50,006 || 77–60 || L2
|- style="text-align:center; background-color:#fbb;"
| 138 || September 5 || Blue Jays || 4–5 || Miller (7–4) || Hermanson (1–1) || Escobar (29) || Fenway Park || 30,021 || 77–61 || L3
|- style="text-align:center; background-color:#bfb"
| 139 || September 6 || Blue Jays || 7–2 || Wakefield (9–5) || Halladay (15–7) || — || Fenway Park || 31,847 || 78–61 || W1
|- style="text-align:center; background-color:#bfb"
| 140 || September 7 || Blue Jays || 4–1 || Fossum (4–3) || Bowles (0–1) || Urbina (31) || Fenway Park || 31,591 || 79–61 || W2
|- style="text-align:center; background-color:#fbb"
| 141 || September 8 || Blue Jays || 4–9 || Loaiza (8–8) || Castillo (5–14) || — || Fenway Park || 31,344 || 79–62 || L1
|- style="text-align:center; background-color:#bfb"
| 142 || September 9 || Devil Rays || 6–3 || Lowe (19–7) || Sturtze (3–16) || Urbina (32) || Tropicana Field || 10,577 || 80–62 || W1
|- style="text-align:center; background-color:#bfb"
| 143 || September 10 || Devil Rays || 12–1 || Burkett (11–7) || Kennedy (7–11) || — || Tropicana Field || 10,891 || 81–62 || W2
|- style="text-align:center; background-color:#bfb"
| 144 || September 11 || Devil Rays || 6–3 || Martínez (18–4) || Wilson (6–10) || Urbina (33) || Fenway Park || 12,415 || 82–62 || W3
|- style="text-align:center; background-color:#bfb"
| 145 || September 12 || Devil Rays || 6–3 || Wakefield (10–5) || Yan (6–8) || Urbina (34) || Fenway Park || 10,149 || 83–62 || W4
|- style="text-align:center; background-color:#fbb"
| 146 || September 13 || Orioles || 3–8 || López (15–7) || Fossum (4–4) || — || Fenway Park || 32,166 || 83–63 || L1
|- style="text-align:center; background-color:#bfb"
| 147 || September 14 || Orioles  || 6–4 || Lowe (20–7) || Hentgen (0–2) || Urbina (35) || Fenway Park || 33,123 || 84–63 || W1
|- style="text-align:center; background-color:#fbb;"
| 148 || September 15 || Orioles  || 3–8 || Johnson (5–13) || Burkett (11–8) || — || Fenway Park || 31,007 || 84–64 || L1
|- style="text-align:center; background-color:#bfb;"
| 149 || September 16 (1)|| Indians || 6–1 || Martínez (19–4) || Rodríguez (2–2) || — || Fenway Park || 30,023 || 85–64 || W1 
|- style="text-align:center; background-color:#fbb;"
| 150 || September 16 (2)|| Indians || 1–7 || Tallet (1–0) || Castillo (5–15) || — || Fenway Park || 31,203 || 85–65 || L1 
|- style="text-align:center; background-color:#bfb;"
| 151 || September 17 || Indians  || 4–2 || Wakefield (11–5) || Sabathia (11–11)  || Urbina (36) || Fenway Park || 31,760 || 86–65 || W1
|- style="text-align:center; background-color:#fbb;"
| 152 || September 18 || Indians  || 4–6 || Riske (2–2) || Embree (3–6) || Báez (4) || Fenway Park || 31,829 || 86–66 || L1
|- style="text-align:center; background-color:#bfb;"
| 153 || September 20 || @ Orioles  || 4–2 || Lowe (21–7) || Hentgen (0–3) || Urbina (37) || Camden Yards || 32,648 || 87–66 || W1
|- style="text-align:center; background-color:#bfb"
| 154 || September 21 || @ Orioles || 3–0 || Burkett (12–8) || Johnson (5–14) || Urbina (38) || Camden Yards || 43,613 || 88–66 || W2
|- style="text-align:center; background-color:#bfb"
| 155 || September 22 || @ Orioles  || 13–2 || Martínez (20–4) || Ponson (7–8) || — || Camden Yards || 30,573 || 89–66 || W3
|- style="text-align:center; background-color:#bfb"
| 156 || September 23 || @ Orioles || 5–4 || Embree (4–6) || Roberts (5–4) || Gomes (1) || Camden Yards || 24,664 || 90–66 || W4
|- style="text-align:center; background-color:#bfb"
| 157 || September 24 || @ White Sox  || 4–2 || Fossum (5–4) || Garland (12–12) || Urbina (39) || Comiskey Park || 14,168 || 91–66 || W5
|- style="text-align:center; background-color:#fbb"
| 158 || September 25|| @ White Sox  || 2–7 || Biddle (3–4) || Lowe (21–8) || — || Comiskey Park || 13,102 || 91–67 || L1
|- style="text-align:center; background-color:#fbb"
| 159 || September 26 || @ White Sox  || 2–3 || Wright (14–12) || Hancock (0–1) || Foulke (11) || Comiskey Park || 12,304 || 91–68 || L2
|- style="text-align:center; background-color:#bfb"
| 160 || September 27 || Devil Rays || 6–1 || Burkett (13–8) || Wilson (6–12) || — || Fenway Park || 32,423 || 92–68 || W1
|- style="text-align:center; background-color:#fbb"
| 161 || September 28 || Devil Rays || 6–9 || Zambrano (8–8) || Howry (3–5) || Carter (2) || Fenway Park || 32,623 || 92–69 || L1
|- style="text-align:center; background-color:#bfb"
| 162 || September 29 || Devil Rays || 11–8 || Castillo (6–15) || Álvarez (2–3) || Urbina (40) || Fenway Park || 32,194 || 93–69 || W1
|-

|Reference:

Awards and honors 
 Derek Lowe – AL Pitcher of the Month (April)
 Pedro Martínez – AL Pitcher of the Month (July)
 Manny Ramirez – Silver Slugger Award (DH), AL Player of the Month (September)

All-Star Game
 Johnny Damon, reserve OF (fan vote selection)
 Nomar Garciaparra, reserve SS
 Shea Hillenbrand, starting 3B
 Derek Lowe, starting P
 Pedro Martínez, reserve P (did not attend)
 Manny Ramirez, starting LF
 Ugueth Urbina, reserve P (roster replacement)

Farm system 

VSL cooperative was with the Milwaukee Brewers.

Source:

References

External links 
 2002 Boston Red Sox team page at Baseball Reference
 2002 Boston Red Sox season at baseball-almanac.com
 2002 Boston Red Sox Draft Selections

Boston Red Sox seasons
Boston Red Sox
Boston Red Sox
Red Sox